Thomas Springer (born 6 November 1984) is an Austrian triathlete. He competed in the men's event at the 2016 Summer Olympics.

References

External links
 

1984 births
Living people
Austrian male triathletes
Olympic triathletes of Austria
Triathletes at the 2016 Summer Olympics
Place of birth missing (living people)
21st-century Austrian people